The Georgian S3 route (Georgian: საერთაშორისო მნიშვნელობის გზა ს3, Saertashoriso mnishvnelobis gza S3, road of international importance), also known as Mtskheta-Stepantsminda-Larsi (Georgia–Russia border) or Georgian Military Road, is a "road of international importance" within the Georgian road network and runs from Mtskheta to the border with Russia near Stepantsminda with a length of . After crossing the Georgian-Russian border the highway continues as A161 to Vladikavkaz, the capital of Russia's North Ossetia–Alania federal republic. The highway is the only open land route between Russia and Georgia (country), while routes via Georgian breakaways South Ossetia and Abkhazia are effectively closed for through traffic (and only facilitate traffic between the breakaways and Russia).

The S3 highway is entirely part of the European E117 and Asian AH81 routes and connects with the Georgian S1 highway at its Southern terminus near Mtskheta. Furthermore, the highway is located in the Mtskheta-Mtianeti region and passes through Zhinvali, Ananuri, Pasanauri and skiresort Gudauri where it reaches its highest point, the Jvari Pass. It has been built as a two lane road, but designs have been developed to upgrade the southern part of the S3 between Natakhtari and Zhinvali to a 2x2 motorway (or dual carriageway) as a northern extension of the S9 Tbilisi Bypass.

Background
The route of the S3 follows the historic Georgian Military Road which goes back many centuries. For a long time it was the only suitable way to pass the central section of the Caucasus mountains while the deep Darial Gorge at the Georgia–Russia border acted as a natural gate for anyone who wanted to pass the mountains, especially from the north. The route was also used by the Russian military to expand its control into Transcaucasia after the Kingdom of Georgia became a protectorate of the Russian Empire in 1783.

Since 1960 the current S3 was one of 37 listed routes in the Soviet Union, as main road 16 between Beslan and Yerevan via Tbilisi. In the early 1980s the Soviet road numbering system was overhauled and the Georgian Military Road became part of the A-301 between Tbilisi (Natakhtari junction with M-27, the current S1) and Beslan. After Georgia regained independence in 1991, the A-301 designation was maintained until 1996 when the current route numbering system was adopted. In that year the "roads of international importance" (S-)category was introduced and the "S3 Mtskheta-Stepantsminda-Larsi (Georgia–Russia border)" replaced the A-301 designation.

The S3 is the only direct road between centrally controlled Georgia and Russia, and is a crucial overland trunk route between Armenia and Russia as well. Between 2006 and 2010 the Larsi border crossing at the northern terminus of the S3 was closed by Russia in response to policies of the Saakashvili administration at the time, and no overland traffic between Georgia and Russia was possible at all, seriously affecting Armenia which relies on trade with Russia. At the instigation of Armenia the border crossing reopened in March 2010.

The upper parts of the highway in the Caucasus Mountains are prone to landslides and heavy snow, which lead to frequent road closures and long (truck) queues. This has led to initiatives by Armenia and Russia to move Georgia to facilitate other available overland routes via its breakaways South Ossetia (Roki Tunnel) and Abkhazia to spread traffic and liability to delays. These initiatives have not brought any concrete progress. Instead, Georgia has begun to upgrade the most sensitive parts of the Georgian Military Road. Near the Russian border a new  tunnel has been built to address the impact of landslides. This was spurred after two massive landslides in 2014 which killed 7 people, heavily damaged the Georgian border checkpoint and blocked traffic for nearly two months in total.

Gudauri tunnel bypass 

It will be routed through the Khada Valley and will consist of a two-lane road plus a separate uphill lane for heavy traffic (2+1) and a  tunnel through the Sadzele mountain, the longest in the Caucasus region.

The vertical difference of  will mainly be overcome at Kvesheti and in the Khada valley. Apart from the long tunnel, the bypass will feature 4 smaller tunnels and 6 bridges, including a  landmark arch bridge and a height of  spanning the Khada Valley and Khadistskali river.

The tunnel drilling started in 2021 and is done with a Tunnel Drilling Machine from China. The cost of the project is $558.6 million and is financed by the Asian Development Bank and the European Bank for Reconstruction and Development (EBRD), with additional state budget funding from the Georgian government.

Future

Route

 

The S3 highway branches off the S1 highway just north of Tbilisi and runs through the rather flat Aragvi river valley straight north, and after a few kilometres the road gets closed in by the mountains while the Aragvi valley continues on a slight incline until Zhinvali while passing through various villages with many local businesses. Zhinvali is a crosspoint for important state routes, the Sh26 to Shatili at the Russian border and the Sh27 to Tianeti. The latter branches off the Sh26 just outside of Zhinvali and offers a northern route to the Kakheti region. Both state routes have been rehabilitated in recent years. From Zhinvali the S3 highway continues along the West arm of its namesake reservoir. From this point the Aragvi river valley turns into a gorge. After Kvesheti, the starting point of the Gudauri Bypass which is under construction through the Khada Valley, the road begins its climb to the Jvari pass via skiresort Gudauri.

The Jvari Pass is part of the north-south watershed of the Caucasus Mountains which separates the Aragvi and terek river basins. At Kobi the highway joins the Terek river which runs through the Dariali Gorge to Russia. Via a few small villages the highway reaches Stepantsminda, the (administrative) center of Kazbegi Municipality and the site of the iconic Gergeti Trinity Church which looms over the Georgian Military Road from above. For many overland travellers it is the first stop in Georgia when coming from Russia.

Between Kobi and Stepantsminda the Terek river valley is relatively wide, but north from Stepantsminda the mountains close in culminating in the Dariali Gorge near the Georgian-Russian border. Here a new 2 km long tunnel has been built in 2018 to protect the road against landslides and avalanches. On other spots avalanche galleries have been constructed as well. The road continues as A161 to Vladikavkaz, the capital of the Russian federal republic North Ossetia–Alania/

Intersections

References

Roads in Georgia (country)